Ipas may refer to:
Intelligent Parking Assist System, technology developing to assist drivers in parking their vehicle
India Pale Ales
Ipas (organization), an international women's health organization